Hitt is an unincorporated community in LaSalle County, Illinois, United States. Hitt is located along the southern border of Ottawa.

References

Unincorporated communities in Illinois
Unincorporated communities in LaSalle County, Illinois
Ottawa, IL Micropolitan Statistical Area